The Nightingale-Bamford School is an independent all-female university-preparatory school founded in 1920 by Frances Nicolau Nightingale and Maya Stevens Bamford. Located in Manhattan on the Upper East Side,  Nightingale-Bamford is a member of the New York Interschool consortium.

Overview
Nightingale's Lower School includes grades K-4. 
Middle School includes grades 5–8, while Upper School includes grades 9–12. 
As of 2021, Nightingale enrolls 686 students, the student-faculty ratio is 6:1, and the average class size is 12 students. Nightingale is typically ranked among the best all-girls private schools in the United States, and, like many private schools in Manhattan, is ranked as one of the most expensive.

History
Frances Nicolau Nightingale and Maya Stevens Bamford founded the school in 1920. NBS was originally named Miss Nightingale's School, officially becoming "The Nightingale-Bamford School" in 1929. Since 1920, NBS has graduated nearly 3,000 alumnae. As of 2008, the School endowment was $74.9 million.

Faculty
Paul Burke has been head of school since July 2012. He succeeded Dorothy Hutcheson, who was head of Nightingale for the prior 20 years.

Technovation Challenge

In April 2013, a team of five upper school students won first place at Technovation Challenge, the world's largest tech competition for girls. The $10,000 prize was used to develop and market their winning app.

Admissions and financial aid
Nightingale-Bamford's admissions process has received media attention for its strict, high-stakes nature.

As of the 2020–2021 school year, 20% of the student body received financial assistance with $5.9 million in grants being awarded.

Diversity
Nightingale-Bamford has a diverse community for an independent school with over 30% of the student body being students of color. The school has a program called Cultural Awareness for Everyone, or informally CAFE. CAFE touches on the basis of not only race, but also class, religion, sexual orientation, gender, and age. To keep diversity at the school a priority, Nightingale recruits actively from an inner-city program called Prep for Prep. Prep for Prep is a leadership development program that offers promising students of color access to a private school education based in New York City.

Partner schools
Nightingale-Bamford has no official partner or brother school. However, the school has activities with St. David's and Allen-Stevenson (both boys schools) and is a member of Interschool, which organizes programs and activities for eight New York City independent schools: Trinity, Dalton, Collegiate, Brearley, Chapin, Spence, Nightingale-Bamford, and Browning.

Notable alumnae

Millicent Fenwick, 1928 – politician 
Amina Gautier, – author
Isabel Gillies, 1988 – author, actress
Lisa Grunwald, 1977 – novelist
Mandy Grunwald, 1975 – political consultant and media advisor
Shoshanna Lonstein Gruss, 1993 – Fashion designer
Sophie von Haselberg – actress, daughter of Bette Midler
Renne Jarrett – actress
Sakina Jaffrey - actress
Alexa Ray Joel – model, daughter of Billy Joel and Christy Brinkley 
Signe Nielsen, New York Public Spaces landscape architect 
Olivia Palermo, 2004 – Socialite and fashion influencer
Michèle Rosier, 1948 – French fashion journalist
Beatriz Stix-Brunell – ballet dancer 
Sarah Thompson, 1997 – actress 
Gloria Morgan Vanderbilt, 1921 – socialite
Cecily von Ziegesar, 1988 – author of Gossip Girl series
Dana (Pam) Wilkey – television personality

In pop culture
Nightingale-Bamford received mention in the Woody Allen film Everyone Says I Love You.
In the Gossip Girl book series by NBS alumna Cecily von Ziegesar '88, the character's elite all-girls school, Constance Billard School for Girls, is based on Nightingale-Bamford and the lives of the girls who attend the school. "[Constance Billard] is completely based on Nightingale," von Ziegesar told ABC News. "But I exaggerated to make it more entertaining."
Nightingale-Bamford is mentioned in the book How I Live Now by Meg Rosoff.
Mentioned briefly in Bunheads by Sophie Flack

References

External links
 Official website

Girls' schools in New York City
Private K-12 schools in Manhattan
Upper East Side
Preparatory schools in New York City
1920 establishments in New York City
Educational institutions established in 1920